There is also a Diocese of Nicaragua (and a Bishop of Nicaragua) in the Anglican Church in Central America.

The Roman Catholic Diocese of León in Nicaragua (erected 3 November 1534) is a suffragan of the Archdiocese of Managua.

Bishops
Diocese of Nicaragua
Erected November 3, 1534

Diocese of León en Nicaragua
Name changed December 2, 1913
Agustin Nicolas Tijerino y Loáisiga (21 November 1921 – 28 March 1945 Died)
Isidro Augusto Oviedo y Reyes (13 June 1946 – 14 April 1969 Resigned)
Manuel Salazar y Espinoza (30 January 1973 – 19 December 1981 Resigned)
Julián Luis Barni Spotti, O.F.M. (18 June 1982 – 2 April 1991 Retired)
César Bosco Vivas Robelo (2 April 1991 – 29 June 2019 Retired)
Sócrates René Sandigo Jirón (29 June 2019 – present)

Coadjutor bishops
Manuel Ulloa y Calvo (1865-1867)
Simeón Pereira y Castellón (1895-1902)

Auxiliary bishop
Manuel Salazar y Espinoza (1969-1973), appointed Bishop here

Other priests of this diocese who became bishops
Isidro Carrillo y Salazar, appointed Auxiliary Bishop of Managua in 1913
Canuto José Reyes y Balladares, appointed Bishop of Granada in 1915
Octavio José Calderón y Padilla, appointed Bishop of Matagalpa in 1946

Territorial losses

Metropolitans
Since it was erected, the see has had four metropolitans.
Archdiocese of Seville (1534 − 1547)
Archdiocese of Lima (1547 − 1743)
Archdiocese of Guatemala (1743 − 1913)
Archdiocese of Managua (1913 − )

See also
 Catholic Church in Nicaragua

References

Leon en Nicaragua
1534 establishments in the Spanish Empire
Leon en Nicaragua